The 1960–61 Polska Liga Hokejowa season was the 26th season of the Polska Liga Hokejowa, the top level of ice hockey in Poland. Eight teams participated in the league, and Legia Warszawa won the championship.

Regular season

Final round

5th-8th place

External links
 Season on hockeyarchives.info

Polska
Polska Hokej Liga seasons
1960–61 in Polish ice hockey